Terms such as regular order, regular orders, and the like can refer to:

 Regular order (United States Congress), a process of governance
 Normal order (disambiguation)

See also
 Order (disambiguation)
 Regular (disambiguation)